The 1885 Newfoundland general election was held on 31 October 1885 to elect members of the 15th General Assembly of Newfoundland in the Newfoundland Colony. The Reform Party had been created by Robert Thorburn on a platform of "Protestant Rights" after supporters of the Orange Order abandoned the Whiteway government after sectarian riots in 1885 against the government's 'denominational compromise'.  Whiteway's Conservative Party was destroyed as a result and Whiteway founded a new Liberal Party. Thorburn's new party swept to power but soon turned away from its sectarian agenda by inviting Catholic Liberals into the Cabinet.

Results by party

Elected members
 Bay de Verde
 Stephen R. March Reform
 A.J.W. McNeilly Reform (speaker)
 Bonavista Bay
 James L. Noonan Reform
 Alfred B. Morine elected in 1886
 Abraham Kean Reform
 Frederick White Reform
 Burgeo-LaPoile
 Alexander M. Mackay Reform
 Burin
 John E. Peters Reform
 Henry LeMessurier Reform
 Carbonear
 Alfred Penney Liberal
 Ferryland
 Daniel Joseph Greene Liberal
 George Shea Liberal
 Fortune Bay
 Robert Bond Independent
 Harbour Grace
 James S. Winter Reform
 Charles Dawe Reform
 Joseph Godden Reform
 Harbour Main
 John Veitch Liberal
 Richard MacDonnell Liberal
 Placentia and St. Mary's
 James McGrath Liberal
 W. J. S. Donnelly Liberal
 George Emerson Liberal
 Port de Grave
 George A. Hutchings Reform
 St. Barbe
 Albert Bradshaw Reform
 St. George's
 Michael H. Carty Liberal
 St. John's East
 Robert J. Kent Liberal
 Thomas J. Murphy Liberal, elected in 1886
 Ambrose Shea Liberal
 Robert J. Parsons Liberal, elected in 1887
 Michael J. O'Mara Liberal
 St. John's West
 Edward Morris Liberal
 Patrick J. Scott Liberal
 James J. Callanan Liberal
 Trinity Bay
 Robert Thorburn Reform
 Walter B. Grieve Reform
 Twillingate-Fogo
 Augustus F. Goodridge Reform
 Smith McKay Reform
 Michael T. Knight Reform

References
 

1885
1885 elections in North America
1885 elections in Canada
Pre-Confederation Newfoundland
1885 in Newfoundland
October 1885 events